Col Bentley (born 2 September 1964) is an Australian former professional rugby league footballer who played for the Penrith Panthers in the Winfield Cup and the Manly-Warringah Sea Eagles in the ARL.

Bentley won the 1991 NSWRL Grand Final with Penrith.

After his retirement from playing, Bentley served on the NRL Judiciary board between 1998 and 1999. In 2002 Bentley was elected to the board of the Penrith District Rugby League Football Club.

References

External links
Col Bentley stats

1964 births
Living people
Rugby league centres
Penrith Panthers players
Manly Warringah Sea Eagles players
Australian rugby league players
Rugby league players from New South Wales